Benjamín Alfonso (born 24 May 1984) is an Argentinean actor, model and industrial designer. He rose to the fame in 2013, playing Axel Piñeiro in the series Señales. In 2015, he gained more popularity for its guest role in the miniseries Historia de un clan as Juani y Educando a Nina (2016) as Martin "Tincho" Massey, both aired in Telefe.

Early life 
Alfonso was born on 22 May 1984 in San Isidro, Buenos Aires where he grew up with his six siblings. He worked in a printing Barracas and lived a while in Hawaii and Costa Rica where he took up surfing, there he worked as a gardener and bartender to pay for all his expenses. In 2006, Alfonso made his first public appearance starring in a commercial for Gillette.

At the age of 22, his psychologist had recommended that he should take theater lessons, after this advice he pursued the career of Industrial Engineering but went on to study Industrial Design from which he received and began to venture into his acting career debuting on the El trece series Enseñame a vivir.

Career 
He began his career as a model with the agency Multitalent Agency, making several photographic productions for different magazines and campaigns to Falabella y Herencia; among other. Then he made his debut as an actor in 2012, participating in soap operas as Dulce amor and Graduados, both aired by Telefe y en Sos mi hombre, aired by El trece.

In 2013, Alfonso is persuaded by a producer with whom he played football to appear in the musical youth series Señales aired in the TV Pública playing Axel Piñeiro an egomaniac, cynical and very competitive guy. He also made the publicity of Twistos with Nicole Luis and for the drink Bretaña.

Filmography

Film

Television

References

External links 
 
 
 
 

1984 births
Living people
Argentine male actors
Argentine male models
People from Buenos Aires
Bailando por un Sueño (Argentine TV series) participants
The Challenge (TV series) contestants